New York City's 43rd City Council district is one of 51 districts in the New York City Council. It has been represented by Democrat Justin Brannan since 2018, succeeding term-limited fellow Democrat Vincent Gentile.

Geography
District 43 is based in Bay Ridge and other neighborhoods along Brooklyn's southwestern waterfront, including Dyker Heights, Bath Beach, and parts of Bensonhurst. Dyker Beach Park and Golf Course is located within the district, as is Calvert Vaux Park.

The district overlaps with Brooklyn Community Boards 10, 11, and 13, and with New York's 10th and 11th congressional districts. It also overlaps with the 22nd and 23rd districts of the New York State Senate, and with the 46th, 47th, 49th, 51st, and 64th districts of the New York State Assembly.

Recent election results

2021

In 2019, voters in New York City approved Ballot Question 1, which implemented ranked-choice voting in all local elections. Under the new system, voters have the option to rank up to five candidates for every local office. Voters whose first-choice candidates fare poorly will have their votes redistributed to other candidates in their ranking until one candidate surpasses the 50 percent threshold. If one candidate surpasses 50 percent in first-choice votes, then ranked-choice tabulations will not occur.

2017

2013

2009

References

New York City Council districts